The 36th CARIFTA Games was held in the National Stadium on the island of Providenciales, Turks and Caicos Islands, on April 7–9, 2007.    Detailed
reports on the results were given.

Participation (unofficial)

Result lists can be found on the CACAC 
website, on the C.F.P.I. Timing website, on the IslandStats website, and on the World Junior Athletics History
website.  An unofficial count yields the number of about 454
athletes (254 junior (under-20) and 200 youth (under-17)) from about 26
countries:

Anguilla (7), Antigua and Barbuda (4), Aruba (4), Bahamas (59), Barbados (31),
Belize (2), Bermuda (18), British Virgin Islands (7), Cayman Islands (18),
Dominica (7), French Guiana (1), Grenada (13), Guadeloupe (18), Guyana (2),
Haiti (12), Jamaica (70), Martinique (34), Montserrat (2), Netherlands
Antilles (11), Saint Kitts and Nevis (33), Saint Lucia (5), Saint Vincent and
the Grenadines (3), Suriname (3), Trinidad and Tobago (46), Turks and Caicos
Islands (35), U.S. Virgin Islands (9).

Records

A total of 12 new games records were set.

In the boys' U-20 category, Jamaican sprinter Yohan Blake already set the
new 100m record to 10.18s (1.5 m/s) in the heat, before improving it again to
10.11s in the final. Ryan Brathwaite from Barbados also
improved (his own) 110 metres hurdles games record twice: first, he achieved
13.65s (-1.0 m/s) in the heat, before setting the final mark to 13.42s in the
final. Jamaal Wilson from the Bahamas defended his high
jump title jumping the new record height of 2.20m. Raymond Brown won the shot put establishing the new games record of 18.27m. And the Jamaican 4x400 metres relay team set the new games record
to 3:07.10.

In the girls' U-20 category, the 100 metres hurdles record was improved 
to 13.51s (1.3 m/s) by Shermaine Williams from Jamaica.

In the boys' U-17 category, Dexter Lee of Jamaica set two new games
records, both in 100 metres (10.34s), and in 200 metres
(21.09s). His compatriot Kemoy Campbell also set two new
games records in 1500 metres (4:00.04), and 3000 metres
(8:46.49). And as in the U-20 category, the records fell in
high jump and shot put: Raymond Higgs from the Bahamas jumped 2.13m,<ref
name=iaaf1/> whereas Quincy Wilson from Trinidad and Tobago reached
16.27m.

In the girls' U-17 category, Deandra Dottin from Barbados threw 42.90m, a width that has not been reached before at the games with the new javelin introduced in 1999.

Moreover, a total of 14 national (senior) records were set by the junior and youth athletes.

The most prominent is the new Barbadian record by Shakera Reece in the women's 100m in 11.34s (1.3 m/s).
The new Anguillian record in high jump was
set by youngster Shinelle Proctor to 1.60m. 
Amanda Edwards set the new record for Antigua and Barbuda for women in javelin throw to 41.11m.
There were two new women's national records for the British Virgin Islands: Chantel Malone reached 12.29m in
triple jump, and the 4x100 metres relay team finished in 46.69s.
The 37.44 metres by Alexandra Terry were a new Caymanian record for women in discus throw.
Sandisha Antoine set the women's record for Saint Lucia in triple jump to 12.11m.

Finally, there were a total of 7 new national records for the host nation Turks and Caicos Islands: in the men's
sector, Robert Jennings needed 10:17.94 for 3000 metres, and the 4x100
metres relay finished in 42.04s.  The new women's records were set by
Kadisha Wickham (59.36s for 400 metres), Shanricka Williams 
(10:59.56 for 3000 metres), Israel Ramsey (4.80m in long jump), Marquita Carter (26.33m in discus throw), and
the 4x100 metres relay team in 50.02s.

Austin Sealy Award

The Austin Sealy Trophy for the most outstanding athlete of the games was awarded to Yohan Blake of Jamaica.  
He won 2 gold medals (100m, and 4 × 100 m relay)
in the junior (U-20) category, setting the new 100m games record to 10.11s.

Medal summary

Medal winners are published by category: Boys under 20 (Junior), Girls Under 20 (Junior), Boys under 17 (Youth) and Girls under 17 (Youth).  Complete results can be found on the CACAC website, on the C.F.P.I. Timing website, on the IslandStats website, and on the World Junior Athletics History
website.

Boys under 20 (Junior)

* Result corrected because of disqualification.  See Doping (below).

: Open event for both junior and youth athletes.

Girls under 20 (Junior)

: Open event for both junior and youth athletes.

Boys under 17 (Youth)

Girls under 17 (Youth)

Doping

* Jamie Payne from Trinidad and Tobago was tested positive
for stanozolol and an elevated testosterone/epitestosterone (T/E) ratio.
Therefore, a 2 years ineligibility (22 May 2007 – 21 May 2009), and a
disqualification of all results from 17 March 2007 were imposed.  As a consequence, the Trinidad and Tobago junior 4 × 100 m relay team (40.22s) lost the silver medal.

Medal table (unofficial)

The official medal count was published.  The mismatch between the unofficial count below and the published one
is explained by the subsequent disqualification of the Trinidad and Tobago 4 x
100 metres junior relay team because of doping violations of one team member.

For the first time, the host country of the games did not win a medal.

References

External links
World Junior Athletics History
Results by C.F.P.I. Timing

CARIFTA
2007 in the Turks and Caicos Islands
CARIFTA Games
Providenciales
2007 in Caribbean sport
International sports competitions hosted by the Turks and Caicos Islands
Athletics competitions in the Turks and Caicos Islands